Dragon's blood tree is a common name for several plants and may refer to:

Dracaena cinnabari, native to Socotra
Dracaena draco, native to the Canary Islands, Cape Verde, Madeira and Morocco
Harungana madagascariensis, native from South Africa to Sudan

Dragon's Blood Trees are one of the most famous groups of trees in the world and are an endangered species known from ancient times. These trees secrete a red resin and often provide resources like leaves used to make rope, forage for bees, and fodder for cattle. Because of their sensitivity to their environment, many times the governments in which are in charge of providing the resources to protect and care for this species of trees, do not have the sufficient funds to do so causing them to become at risk of extinction.

See also
 Dragon's blood (disambiguation)